Thomas Edward Higgins  (March 18, 1888 – February 14, 1959) was a pitcher in Major League Baseball who played for the St. Louis Cardinals from 1909 to 1910.

Sources

Major League Baseball pitchers
St. Louis Cardinals players
Baseball players from Illinois
1888 births
1959 deaths
Little Rock Travelers players
Tacoma Tigers players
Rockford Wakes players